Erigeron denalii  is a North American species of flowering plants in the family Asteraceae known by the common name Denali fleabane. It is found in Alaska, Yukon, British Columbia, and Northwest Territories.

Erigeron denalii  is a very short perennial herb rarely more than 5 cm (2 inches) tall. Each stem generally has only one flower head, with 30–55 white or lavender ray florets surrounding numerous yellow disc florets.

The species is named for Denali, the tallest mountain in North America.

References

denalii
Flora of Alaska
Flora of Western Canada
Plants described in 1945
Taxa named by Aven Nelson
Flora without expected TNC conservation status